Robert Stanley Black (24 August 1893 – 21 September 1916) was a New Zealand rugby union player. A first five-eighth, Black represented Otago and Buller at a provincial level, and was a member of the New Zealand national side, selected for the All Blacks, on their 1914 tour of Australia whilst representing the Otago province.

He played in six of the matches on tour including the first test and scored three tries. Working as a clerk in the Bank of New South Wales, Black was posted, on his return from Sydney, to Westport where he played two games for Buller in September. He was back in Dunedin in 1915 but Pirates did not field a team in the senior championship so he transferred to the University of Otago club and played twice for Otago.

Black enlisted in the Otago Mounted Rifles in November 1915 and, after transferring to the Canterbury Regiment, saw active service in the Battle of the Somme. He was killed in action on 21 September 1916, and he was memorialised on the Caterpillar Valley (New Zealand) Memorial, which commemorates over 1200 New Zealand soldiers who died in the Battles of the Somme in 1916 for whom there is no known grave, although his body was subsequently identified and buried.

References

1893 births
1916 deaths
People from Arrowtown
People educated at Otago Boys' High School
New Zealand rugby union players
New Zealand international rugby union players
Otago rugby union players
Buller rugby union players
Rugby union fly-halves
New Zealand military personnel killed in World War I
New Zealand Army personnel
Burials at Caterpillar Valley Cemetery
Rugby union players from Otago
New Zealand Military Forces personnel of World War I
New Zealand Army soldiers